Juan Cruz Esquivel (born 22 August 2000) is an Argentine professional footballer who plays as a left winger for Platense, on loan from Talleres de Córdoba.

Career
Esquivel began in the senior ranks of Atlético de Rafaela, after joining from Juventud Unida Rosquín. Having been an unused substitute on the bench in a Primera B Nacional home loss to Villa Dálmine on 1 February 2019, the midfielder appeared for his professional bow under manager Juan Manuel Llop three weeks later versus Defensores de Belgrano; he was subbed on for the final twenty-two minutes in place of Matías Quiroga.

Career statistics
.

References

External links

2000 births
Living people
People from San Martín Department, Santa Fe
Argentine footballers
Association football wingers
Primera Nacional players
Atlético de Rafaela footballers
Talleres de Córdoba footballers
Club Atlético Platense footballers
Sportspeople from Santa Fe Province